Lieutenant Colonel George Frederick Bertrand  (9 February 1891 – 25 July 1957) was an officer of the New Zealand Military Forces who served in both the First and Second World Wars.

Early life

George Bertrand was born on 9 February 1891 in Urenui, New Zealand. His father was an English immigrant and his mother was Māori (Ngāti Mutunga). Betrand attended Te Aute College and Wellington Teachers' Training College

Military career
With the outbreak of the First World War in 1914, Bertrand enlisted in the New Zealand Expeditionary Force and was posted to the Wellington Battalion. He served in Gallipoli and on the Western Front. He was wounded three times and rose to the rank of lieutenant.

Between the wars, Bertrand served as a territorial officer in the Taranaki Regiment and rose to become its commanding officer in 1931.

During the Second World War, Bertrand was made second in command of the 28th (Māori) Battalion and saw action in Greece, Crete and North Africa. He returned to New Zealand in 1942 and commanded the 2nd Māori Battalion until 1944.

Civilian life
Bertrand taught at New Plymouth Boys' High School between the two world wars and again after World War II. He was a member of the Ngarimu Scholarship Fund Board.

Later life

Bertrand died in Palmerston North on 25 July 1957 from injuries suffered in a car crash. He was buried in Te Henui Cemetery in New Plymouth.

Honours and awards
Bertrand was made an Officer of the Order of the British Empire in the 1943 New Year Honours.

References

1891 births
1957 deaths
New Zealand Officers of the Order of the British Empire
New Zealand Army officers
New Zealand Military Forces personnel of World War I
New Zealand military personnel of World War II
People from Taranaki
Ngāti Mutunga people
New Zealand people of English descent
People educated at Te Aute College
New Zealand schoolteachers
Road incident deaths in New Zealand
Burials at Te Henui Cemetery